Senecio californicus is a species of flowering plant in the aster family known by the common name California ragwort.

Distribution
This annual herb is native to Central and Southern California and Baja California. It grows in Coastal strand, Coastal sage scrub, and Chaparral habitats, often in sandy areas.

It is often seen at the coast on sand dunes.  It is also often found in the Peninsular Ranges, and is seen into the central/eastern Transverse Ranges.

Description
The stems can be solitary or grow in branching clusters.

The leaves have linear or lance-shaped blades up to 7 centimeters long. They are sometimes fleshy, especially in plants that occur on the coastline.

The inflorescence produces one to ten or more flower heads, which are lined with usually about 21 black-tipped phyllaries. They contain many yellow disc florets and each has usually 13 yellow ray florets about a centimeter long. The bloom period is March through May.

See also

References

External links
 Calflora Database: Senecio californicus (California butterweed,  California groundsel, California ragwort)
Jepson Manual eFlora (TJM2) treatment of Senecio californicus
UC CalPhotos gallery of Senecio californicus (California ragwort)

californicus
Flora of Baja California
Flora of California
Natural history of the California chaparral and woodlands
Natural history of the California Coast Ranges
Natural history of the Peninsular Ranges
Natural history of the Transverse Ranges
Taxa named by Augustin Pyramus de Candolle
Flora without expected TNC conservation status